Louie Louie (born Louis Cordero) is a Puerto Rican/American musician, record producer, and actor. He released four full-length albums (two of them on major record labels and one under his full name of Louie Cordero) in the last twenty years, as well as a number of singles, but only two of the singles, 1990's "Sittin' in the Lap of Luxury" and "I Wanna Get Back with You", charted in the United States.

He played Madonna's boyfriend in the video for "Borderline" and also played 'Rick' in House Party 2. He and his band performed on Arsenio Hall two times. Louie toured the United States and Canada with Erasure.

Discography

Albums
The State I'm In (WTG Records, 1990) Billboard Top 200 peak #136
Let's Get Started (Warner Bros. Records, 1993)
Louie Cordero (Trauma Records, 1996, as Louie Cordero)
Dance Love Work (DLW, 2002)

Singles

References

Living people
Place of birth missing (living people)
Year of birth missing (living people)
Puerto Rican record producers
20th-century American musicians
21st-century American musicians
20th-century American singers
21st-century American singers
20th-century American male singers
21st-century American male singers